Austin Krajicek and Rajeev Ram were the defending champions, but only Krajicek chose to defend his title partnering Alejandro Falla. Krajicek and Falla withdrew before playing a match.

Santiago González and Mate Pavić won the title, defeating Sam Groth and Leander Paes 6–4, 3–6, [13–11] in the final.

Seeds

Draw

References
 Main Draw

Torneo Internacional Challenger Leon - Doubles
Torneo Internacional Challenger León